OSM TV is a Bosnian commercial television channel based in Pale, Bosnia and Herzegovina. The program is mainly produced in Serbian. TV station was established in 1993 under the name "Otvorene Srpske Mreže". According to the recommendations and guidelines of the Communications Regulatory Agency of Bosnia and Herzegovina, the official name has been changed to OSM TV.

External links 
 
 Communications Regulatory Agency of Bosnia and Herzegovina

Mass media in Istočno Sarajevo
Television stations in Bosnia and Herzegovina
Television channels and stations established in 1993